Roy Halston Frowick (April 23, 1932 – March 26, 1990), known mononymously as Halston, was an American fashion designer who rose to international fame in the 1970s.

His minimalist, clean designs, often made of cashmere or ultrasuede, were a new phenomenon in the mid-1970s discotheques and redefined American fashion. Halston was known for creating a relaxed urban lifestyle for American women. He was frequently photographed at Studio 54 with his close friends Liza Minnelli, Bianca Jagger, Joe Eula, and Andy Warhol.

In the early 1950s, while attending the School of the Art Institute of Chicago, Halston began a business designing and making women's hats.  He garnered a well-known clientele and opened a store on Chicago's Magnificent Mile in 1957.   He later became the head milliner for high-end New York City department store Bergdorf Goodman.  His fame rose when he designed the pillbox hat Jacqueline Kennedy wore to the inauguration of her husband, President John F. Kennedy, in 1961. In the late 1960s, Halston made the transition to women's clothing, opening a boutique on Madison Avenue in New York and started a ready-to-wear line.  After several ill-advised business decisions, Halston eventually lost control of his fashion house in the 1980s. He died of AIDS-related cancer in 1990 at the age of 57.

Early life and education

Roy Halston Frowick was born on April 23, 1932, in Des Moines, Iowa, the second son of accountant James Edward Frowick who was of Norwegian descent, and his stay-at-home wife Hallie Mae (née Holmes). Halston developed an early interest in sewing from his grandmother and he began creating hats and altering clothes for his mother and sister. He grew up in Des Moines, and moved to Evansville, Indiana, at the age of 14. He graduated from Benjamin Bosse High School in 1950.  He briefly attended Indiana University.

Career

Early years 

In 1952, Halston moved to Chicago, where he enrolled in a night course at the School of the Art Institute of Chicago, and worked as a window dresser. In 1953, he opened his own hat business. His first customer was radio actress and comedian Fran Allison. Halston's hats were also bought by Kim Novak, Gloria Swanson, Deborah Kerr, and Hedda Hopper.

Halston's first big break came when the Chicago Daily News ran a brief story on his hats. In 1957, he opened his first shop, the Boulevard Salon, on North Michigan Avenue. It was at this point that he began to use his middle name to trade under. During his childhood, he had been referred to as Halston to distinguish between himself and his uncle Roy. Halston moved to New York City in late 1957, first working for milliner Lilly Daché. Within a year, he had been named the co-designer at Daché, became acquainted with several fashion editors and publishers, and left Daché's studio to become head milliner for department store Bergdorf Goodman in their customer milliner salon.

Popularity 

Halston achieved great fame after designing the pillbox hat worn by Jacqueline Kennedy to her husband's presidential inauguration in 1961, and when he moved to designing women's wear, Newsweek dubbed him "the premier fashion designer of all America". When hats fell out of fashion, Halston moved on to designing clothing, made possible by Estelle Marsh, a millionaire from Amarillo, Texas. Marsh was his sole financial backer during this critical time of development. He opened his first boutique on Madison Avenue in 1968. The collection that year included a dark jade velvet wedding gown for advertising executive Mary Wells Lawrence. Lawrence was married to the CEO of Braniff International Airways, Harding Lawrence. She would be instrumental in bringing Halston to Braniff in 1976 to design Braniff's hostess, pilot, ticket agent, and ground personnel uniforms.

Halston launched his first ready-to-wear line, Halston Limited, in 1969. Halston's design was usually simple, minimalist yet sophisticated, glamorous and comfortable at the same time. Halston liked to use soft, luxurious fabric like silk and chiffon. He later told Vogue that he got rid of "...all of the extra details that didn't work—bows that didn't tie, buttons that didn't button, zippers that didn't zip, wrap dresses that didn't wrap. I've always hated things that don't work." Halston changed the fitted silhouette and showed the female body shape by allowing the natural flow of the fabric to create its own shape. Halston said "Pants give women the freedom to move around they've never had before. They don't have to worry about getting into low furniture or low sportscars. Pants will be with us for many years to come—probably forever if you can make that statement in fashion."

Halston's boutique drew celebrity clients like Greta Garbo, Babe Paley, Anjelica Huston, Gene Tierney, Lauren Bacall, Margaux Hemingway, Elizabeth Taylor, Bianca Jagger and Liza Minnelli (both Jagger and Minnelli would become close friends). From 1968 to 1973, his line earned an estimated $30 million.

In 1970, Hope Portocarrero, first lady of Nicaragua and client,  issued a postage stamp dedicated to Halston.

In 1973, Halston sold his line to Norton Simon, Inc. for $16 million but remained its principal designer. This afforded him creative control with near unlimited financial backing. In 1975, Max Factor released Halston's first namesake fragrance for women. By 1977, sales from the perfume had generated $85 million. Throughout the 1970s, Halston had expanded his line to include menswear, luggage, handbags, lingerie and bedding. Vogue later noted that Halston was responsible for popularizing caftans, which he made for Jacqueline Kennedy; matte jersey halter top dresses; and polyurethane in American fashion.

Halstonettes 
As Halston's popularity and fame grew, those he worked with also became well known. His favored models included Pat Cleveland, Anjelica Huston, Heidi Goldberg, Karen Bjornson, Beverly Johnson, Nancy North, Chris Royer, Alva Chinn, Connie Cook, and Pat Ast. This entourage of models were eventually dubbed “The Halstonettes” by fashion journalist André Leon Talley. The Halstonettes appeared together in editorials and ads for Halston clothing and cosmetics and appeared at many Halston-related events. The troupe often travelled with Halston, attended his galas, acted as his muses, and reflected ethnic diversity (Halston was one of the first major designers to hire models of different races to walk in his shows and appear in his ads).

Uniforms for Braniff Airways

Halston was very influential in the design of uniforms. In 1977 he was contracted by Braniff International Airways to create a new look for their flight attendants. He created muted brown uniforms with a distinctive "H" logo. Halston created interchangeable separates in shades of bone, tan and taupe which the airline extended to the seat covers, using brown Argentine leather. The entire scheme was dubbed "Ultra Touch" by the airline in reference to Halston's ultrasuede designs, and was extremely evocative of the late 1970s. An elaborate party was thrown in February 1977, dubbed Three Nights in Acapulco, to introduce the new Halston fashions along with the new and elegant Braniff International Airways.

Braniff chairman Harding Lawrence, his wife Mary Wells Lawrence, First Lady Lady Bird Johnson, and Halston himself along with his Halstonettes were in attendance for the grand presentation. Halston and his entourage would arrive at selected points during the party in outfits that matched the deep tones of Braniff Airways' new color schemes that would be applied to their aircraft as part of the new so-called Elegance Campaign. The party and the Halston creations were a hit not only with the fashion press but also with Braniff employees, who thought they were the easiest and most comfortable uniforms they had ever worn.

He was asked by the U.S. Olympic Committee to design the Pan American Games and U.S. Olympic Team's uniforms in 1976. He also designed the uniforms for the Girl Scouts, the New York Police Department, and the Avis Rent a Car System.

Later years 
In 1983, Halston signed a six-year licensing deal worth a reported $1 billion with retail chain J. C. Penney. The line, called Halston III, consisted of affordable clothing, accessories, cosmetics and perfumes ranging from $24 to $200. At the time, the move was considered controversial, as no other high-end designer had ever licensed their designs to a mid-priced chain retail store. While Halston was excited about the deal and felt that it would only expand his brand, the deal damaged his image with high-end fashion retailers who felt that his name had been "cheapened". Bergdorf Goodman at the time dropped his Halston Limited line from their store shortly after plans for Halston III were announced.

In 1983, Halston Limited, which was owned by Norton Simon, Inc., was acquired by Esmark Inc. After the acquisition, Halston began to lose control over his namesake company and grew frustrated. As the label changed hands (it would be owned by Playtex International, Beatrice Foods and four other companies), Halston continued to lose control and, by 1984, was banned from creating designs for Halston Enterprises. He attempted to buy back his company through protracted negotiations. Halston Enterprises was eventually acquired by Revlon in 1986. Halston was paid a salary by Revlon but had stopped designing clothing for the company. He continued designing for family and friends, most notably Liza Minnelli and Martha Graham. In 1986, Halston designed the costumes for the Martha Graham Dance Company's Temptations of the Moon. After his contract with Revlon expired, he was in talks to sign a new contract with the company but stopped negotiations after he learned that Revlon planned to continue the line without his input. The line continued on with various designers until 1990, when Revlon discontinued the clothing portion of the line but continued selling Halston perfumes.

Personal life 

Halston's on-again off-again lover was Venezuelan-born artist Victor Hugo. The two met while Hugo was working as a makeup artist in 1972. The two began a relationship and Hugo lived on and off in Halston's home. Halston soon hired Hugo to work as his window dresser. Their on-and-off relationship lasted a little over ten years.

According to The New York Times, Halston was known to have had an affair with fashion designer Luis Estevez.

Death 

In 1988, Halston tested positive for HIV. After his health began to fail, he moved to San Francisco, where he was cared for by his family. On March 26, 1990, he died of Kaposi's sarcoma, an AIDS-defining illness, at the California Pacific Medical Center in San Francisco. His remains were cremated.

Commemoration 
In June 1990, Halston's longtime friend the singer and actress Liza Minnelli sponsored a tribute at Lincoln Center's Alice Tully Hall that was followed by a reception hosted by his friend Elsa Peretti.

In 2010, Halston was the subject of the documentary Ultrasuede: In Search of Halston.

From November 2014 to January 2015, a traveling exhibition entitled Halston and Warhol Silver and Suede was sponsored by the Warhol Museum and co-curated by Halston's niece Lesley Frowick.

From February to April 2015, an exhibition was held in the museum of the Fashion Institute of Technology in New York City to celebrate Halston's 1970s fashions.

In March 2017, Halston Style, a retrospective of his career, opened at the Nassau County Museum of Art. The retrospective was curated by Halston's niece Lesley Frowick and features material derived from his personal archives that he gave to her before his death. Frowick also authored the accompanying catalogue, Halston: Inventing American Fashion.

In May 2019, the documentary Halston, directed by Frédéric Tcheng was released. The documentary revived interest in Halston and The Halstonettes. In May 2019,  The New York Times released an article, "Halston’s Women Have Their Say" which outlined many of the Halstonette women reflecting on their experience. A similar article was published in August 2019, by CNN titled, "Free Inside Our Clothes: Top Models Remember What It Was Like to Walk a Halston Show".

According to fashion critic Robin Givhan, when Tom Ford relaunched Gucci and Yves Saint Laurent in the late 1990s, he found his inspiration in the glittering glamour of Halston's style: "When Ford added Yves Saint Laurent to his workload in 1999, he did due diligence in researching the house's history. But his work continued to display a louche attitude that recalled the best of Halston."

Ewan McGregor portrayed the designer in the television miniseries Halston, which premiered May 14, 2021 on Netflix, adapted from the 1991 biography Simply Halston by Steven Gaines.

Company 

Since Halston's death in 1990, his namesake company changed hands several times.

After Revlon ceased production of the clothing portion of the company in 1990, it was purchased by Borghese in 1991. In 1996, sportswear firm Tropic Tex bought the Halston clothing license (Revlon still retains the rights to Halston fragrances) and hired designer Randolph Duke to relaunch the line. Duke's first collection debuted in fall 1997 to critical acclaim. Mariah Carey, Celine Dion and Minnie Driver (who wore a crimson Halston dress to the 70th Academy Awards ceremony) were among the celebrities to wear the new Halston creations. By 1998, Duke left the company after it was sold to Catterton-Simon, a private equity fund. Later that year, designer Kevan Hall was hired as head designer for the label then called House of Halston. Hall's first collection for the label debuted in Spring 1998 to critical acclaim. In 1999, Catterton-Simon sold Halston Enterprises to Neema Clothing. Head designer Kevan Hall left the House of Halston in 2000.

After Hall's departure, Halston's new owner, James J. Ammeen, planned to relaunch the Halston line as a luxury brand and hired designer Bradley Bayou. Bayou's line, Bradley Bayou for Halston, was worn by Oprah Winfrey and Queen Latifah. Bayou left Halston in frustration in 2005 after Ammeen refused to give Bayou more money for advertising.

In 2006, Jimmy Choo co-founder Tamara Mellon, stylist Rachel Zoe, and film producer Harvey Weinstein partnered with Hilco Consumer Capital to purchase the line in another effort to relaunch it. Problems about the line's new direction quickly arose when Tamara Mellon and Rachel Zoe could not agree on a designer. Former Versace designer Marco Zanini was eventually hired in July 2007.

From 2007 to 2008, Halston under the Tamara Mellon administration approached and voted in Chris Royer as the Halston Archivist and a member of their advisory board. She developed the Hilco/Halston Archive of over 300 Halston vintage unique pieces, which included editorial articles and all background information in reference to Halston design. In 2008, Chris Royer curated the “Neiman Marcus Halston Glam" exhibition in San Francisco utilizing the Halston/Hilco archives. And certain pieces were loaned again in 2014 for the "Halston and Warhol: Silver and Suede" traveling exhibition.

Zanini's Halston collection debuted in February 2008 to mixed reviews. Zanini left Halston in July 2008 and a British designer, Marios Schwab, was hired in May 2009. Halston Enterprises then decided to launch a second line called Halston Heritage. The Heritage line is based on archived sketches by Halston with modern updates. In 2009, actress Sarah Jessica Parker wore two Halston Heritage dresses in the film Sex and the City 2 and the company hired her as the president and chief creative officer for the mainline. She also oversaw the Halston Heritage line.

In February 2011, Marios Schwab released his first Halston collection for the autumn/winter season. During her tenure as creative director, Sarah Jessica Parker chose jeweler Jacqueline Rabun to design a selection of silver accessories.

Nevertheless, Schwab's collection debuted to negative critical reception. In the August 2011 issue of American Vogue, Sarah Jessica Parker revealed that she had left the company. Schwab and Harvey Weinstein left the company shortly thereafter.

In late 2011, Hilco Consumer Capital consolidated ownership and brought in Ben Malka, former president of BCBG, to continue the Halston Heritage business as chairman and CEO. Malka enlisted the help of Marie Mazelis, the former creative director of Max Azria and Hervé Léger, to spearhead the re-launch of the contemporary line. Hilco decided to focus exclusively on the Halston Heritage ready-to-wear activity and invested an additional $7.5 million for its development.

In September 2012, the company moved its headquarters from New York to Los Angeles. In February 2013, Halston Heritage signed a deal with the Majid Al Futtaim Group for distribution of its products in the United Arab Emirates. In 2015, the company sold H by Halston and H Halston to the company Xcel that specializes in bringing fairly known brands to mass market outlets.

The fall 2018 collection was focused on athleisure apparel.

Ken Downing was named the creative director of Halston in 2022.

References

External links

 Company website
 
 

American fashion designers
1932 births
1990 deaths
AIDS-related deaths in California
American company founders
American fashion businesspeople
LGBT fashion designers
American milliners
High fashion brands
Clothing companies established in 1968
Design companies established in 1968
1968 establishments in New York City
Artists from Des Moines, Iowa
LGBT people from Iowa
People from Evansville, Indiana
Gay men
Luxury brands
School of the Art Institute of Chicago alumni
American people of Norwegian descent
Deaths from cancer in California
20th-century American businesspeople
1970s fashion
20th-century American LGBT people